Hymenobacter monticola  is a Gram-negative, aerobic, rod-shaped and non-motile bacterium from the genus of Hymenobacter which has been isolated from mountain soil in Sichuan in China.

References

External links
Type strain of Hymenobacter monticola at BacDive -  the Bacterial Diversity Metadatabase

monticola
Bacteria described in 2016